Jack Haigh (1928–2007) was an English footballer who played as an inside forward in the Football League. He also played for Rawmarsh Welfare F.C.

Signed by Scunthorpe from Liverpool for £4,000 in August 1952, Haigh earned the nickname the 'Iron Man' after starring in Scunthorpe's FA Cup victory over Newcastle United in January 1958.

He was described by ex-England manager Graham Taylor  as "an inside-forward of craft and cunning. Today he would be described as a midfield genius and would be a regular in the England team. He could see and make a pass that no other play could see or make."

Haigh sits sixth on the Scunthorpe United all-time appearance list, with 360 appearances and 71 goals in all competitions. Following his retirement in 1965, Jack and his wife Doris settled in the Balby area of Doncaster, where for many years the couple ran a corner shop.

References

External links
Jack Haigh fansite
Jack Haigh's Career

1928 births
2007 deaths
English footballers
Footballers from Rotherham
Association football inside forwards
Gainsborough Trinity F.C. players
Liverpool F.C. players
Scunthorpe United F.C. players
Doncaster Rovers F.C. players
Buxton F.C. players
English Football League players